Dings Crusaders RFC is an English rugby union team based in the Bristol suburb of Frenchay having previously been based in Lockleaze up until 2018. The club was relegated from National Division Two South, the fourth tier of the English rugby union system in 2015, to the South West Premier After two seasons, the team won promotion back to National League 2 South for the 2018–19 season and currently play in National League 2 West

Dings is one of the oldest clubs in Bristol, with its roots in a slum area of Bristol stretching back over 110 years. The club is entirely amateur, as opposed to the semi-professional structure of other clubs. The mantra "we don't play for personal gain" is a poignant line in the club's anthem, being very much a part of the community of Lockleaze it is not uncommon to find that some players in the teams today are third generation Dings players.

Current standings

History
The Dings was a slum area of Bristol located between Barton Hill and Temple Meads. The Shaftesbury Crusade, a Christian mission in the area, encouraged sporting activity in the Dings. In 1897, H W Rudge founded Dings Crusaders as part of the Dings Boys Club. Dings is one of only two remaining members of the original Bristol Combination set up in 1901, the other being Bristol Saracens.
In 1948, Jack Steadman instigated a move to Dings current home in Lockleaze. Since league structure was introduced, Dings gained three promotions between 1996 and 2003 to enter the National League for the first time. The club finished in the relegation places at the end of the 2003–04 season, their first in National Division Three South, but were spared demotion by the demise of Wakefield. Since then, the club has consolidated its position within the league.

In 2014 it was announced that the club would be moving from the 1,500 capacity Lockleaze ground to Shaftesbury Park, which is based on Frenchay Park Road in Frenchay, South Gloucestershire. The new ground will be part of a £8 million pound sports facility with a main stand/club house, a gym and two court sports hall, eight changing rooms, two full size floodlight pitches including the main pitch which will have an 4G artificial surface, parking for up to 220 cars and multiple junior pitches.  Capacity will include 250 seated and up to 2,000 standing, bring the total figure up to approximately 2,250.

On 17 February 2018 after 10 years in the making, Dings finally played their first game at Shaftesbury Park in front of a crowd of around 1,000, defeating Weston-super-Mare 34–26 in a South West Premier league game.

Honours
 Bristol Combination Cup winners (7): 1973–74, 1985–86, 1990–91, 1994–95, 1995–96, 2010–11, 2014–15
 Gloucestershire 1 champions: 1989–90
 Gloucestershire/Somerset champions: 1993–94
 Western Counties champions: 1995–96
 South West Division 2 West champions: 2000–01
 South West Premier champions (2): 2002–03, 2017–18

Current squad

Club officials
President : Raymond Bowden

Vice President : Phillip Knowles

General Secretary : Ian Haddrell

Treasurer : Jeff Kemp

Chairman : Steve Lloyd

Chairman of Selectors : Richard Grant

Commercial Manager : Richard Milsom

Membership  Secretary : Richard  Cecil

Head Coach : Luke Arscott

Director of Rugby : Stean Williams

Club Captain : Steve Plummer

References

External links
 Official website

English rugby union teams
Rugby clubs established in 1897
Rugby union in Bristol